"Still" is a 1963 single by Bill Anderson. "Still" was Anderson's second number one on the country chart, staying at the top spot for seven non-consecutive weeks.  The song crossed over to the pop chart, peaking at number eight. Anderson performed this song on the finale of the 1977-1978 ABC game show The Better Sex which he co-hosted with Sarah Purcell.

This song is mostly spoken in the two verses, rather than sung, except for the repeated refrains, that are done with a female chorus. The narrator misses his girl, since she went away, and hopes to have her back again someday soon, saying that he is still here.

Chart performance

Other recordings
1963 Al Martino included in his album I Love You Because.
1963 Bing Crosby for his album Bing Crosby Sings the Great Country Hits.
1963 Karl Denver - this spent 13 weeks in the UK charts peaking at No. 15.
1963 Ken Dodd - this spent ten weeks in the UK charts peaking at No. 35.

References

External links
 

1963 singles
Bill Anderson (singer) songs
Billboard Hot Country Songs number-one singles of the year
Songs written by Bill Anderson (singer)
1963 songs
Decca Records singles
Song recordings produced by Owen Bradley